Brian Waltrip (born January 12, 1978) is an American former soccer player, who has played professionally in the United States, Finland, Portugal, Norway and Japan.

Career
Waltrip was born in Pensacola, Florida. During his youth he played for both São Paulo FC of Brazil and VFB Stuttgart of Germany. He then went on to play college soccer at the University of South Florida and was a Hermann Trophy candidate in 1999. In 1999, he left university for an offer to play in France for Racing Club de Strasbourg. He was selected in the 2000 MLS Superdraft by the Tampa Bay Mutiny. He opted out of this contract and chose instead to play for Tampere United of the Veikkausliiga in Finland. Only half a season later he signed with C.D. Olivais e Moscavide and thereafter C.F. Os Belenenses of the Portuguese top league.

Leaving Portugal, Waltrip went back up north to play with Mandalskameratene in Norway. After one and a half successful seasons there his contract was bought by Sandefjord. He was there for another year and a half until January 2007 when he was bought by Sogndal. After another successful season he was bought by Molde FK. In 2010, he left Norway for Japan and spent the next 2 seasons with A.S. Laranja (Kansai League) in Kyoto, Japan.

References

1978 births
Living people
American soccer players
Soccer players from Florida
Sportspeople from Pensacola, Florida
Mandalskameratene players
Sandefjord Fotball players
Sogndal Fotball players
Molde FK players
South Florida Bulls men's soccer players
Tampere United players
Veikkausliiga players
Eliteserien players
American expatriate soccer players
Expatriate footballers in Norway
Expatriate footballers in Finland
Expatriate footballers in Portugal
Expatriate footballers in Japan
American expatriate sportspeople in Norway
American expatriate sportspeople in Finland
American expatriate sportspeople in Portugal
American expatriate sportspeople in Japan
C.D. Olivais e Moscavide players
Tampa Bay Mutiny draft picks
Association football midfielders